Jaffna Tamil may refer to:

Jaffna Tamil dialect, native to the Jaffna Peninsula, Sri Lanka
Jaffna Tamils, members of the Tamil ethnic group native to Sri Lanka